Manuel Salz (born 6 August 1985) is a German former professional footballer who played as a goalkeeper

Career 
Salz was born in Böblingen, Baden-Württemberg. He began his career with SV Hohenwart and signed than with VfR Pforzheim in 2002. In summer 2003, he left VfR Pforzheim and signed with Stuttgarter Kickers where he played for the reserve team. After fifty games with the reserve Oberliga Baden-Württemberg, he was promoted to the 3. Liga team.

On 22 April 2009, he announced his departure from Stuttgarter Kickers. On 29 May 2009, Salz signed a contract with SC Freiburg until 30 June 2011.

Salz retired from playing in summer 2021, leaving 1. CfR Pforzheim for which he had played since 2014.

Personal life 
His brother Dominik is also a footballer. They played together at 1. FC Pforzheim.

References

External links
 
 
 

1985 births
Living people
People from Böblingen
Sportspeople from Stuttgart (region)
German footballers
Footballers from Baden-Württemberg
Association football goalkeepers
Bundesliga players
3. Liga players
Stuttgarter Kickers players
FC Rot-Weiß Erfurt players
SC Freiburg players